The Freeway Sanitary Landfill is a United States Environmental Protection Agency Superfund site that covers  in Burnsville, Minnesota. In 1971 the Minnesota Pollution Control Agency (MCPA) licensed the landfill to accept  of household, commercial, demolition, and nonhazardous industrial wastes. The state permit prohibited the disposal of liquids and hazardous wastes; however, heavy metals, acids, and bases were accepted by the landfill from local industries. The waste is covered by a low permeability soil cover.

Groundwater contains contaminants which exceed drinking water standards, including volatile organic compounds (VOCs) such as tetrachloroethylene and vinyl chloride, and manganese and thallium. These wells serve approximately 36,000 people. Currently the groundwater beneath the Freeway Landfill flows south into the Kraemer Quarry due to long term dewatering of the quarry for mining purposes.

Threats and contaminants
Groundwater contains contaminants which exceed drinking water standards including VOCs such as tetrachloroethylene and vinyl chloride, and manganese and thallium.  Other contaminants exceed surface water criteria. Exposure to contaminated groundwater is possible if the pollutants migrate to the Burnsville municipal well field or discharges into the Minnesota River where wildlife could be harmed. Based on site conditions, the Minnesota Pollution Control Agency (MPCA) has established a groundwater area of concern which extends out from the landfill based on ground measurements.

Landfill gases are also a threat at the site. Currently no landfill gas venting system exists at the site. Eight gas monitoring probes exist around the landfill perimeter. Based on the large mass of waste present, no landfill gas venting system, no recent gas monitoring data, and recognizing the potential for gas to migrate under seasonal low permeable (frozen) conditions, the MPCA has established a methane gas area of concern which extends  beyond the waste footprint.

Cleanup progress
The site is being addressed through a long-term cleanup action.  In 1986, U.S. EPA began an investigation into the nature and extent of contamination at the site.  In 1989, the state became the lead agency for the investigation.  The state has issued areas of concern for landfill gases and groundwater.  Additional measures are needed concerning the landfill to assure long-term protection of human health and the environment.  Currently, pumping related to a nearby quarry operation is acting as an interim groundwater treatment system and is controlling human exposure to groundwater.  When this pumping ceases, additional measures will also be needed to assure that human exposure to groundwater remains controlled and to protect the nearby river environment.

See also 
 Landfill
 Landfills in the United States

References 

'' The initial version of this page was source from the US government's Environmental Protection Agency website:
EPA Fact Sheet for Freeway Sanitary Landfill

Superfund sites in Minnesota
Geography of Dakota County, Minnesota